Pseudogastrioceratinae is one of two subfamilies of the Paragastrioceratidae family. They are an extinct group of ammonoid, which are shelled cephalopods related to squids, belemnites, octopuses, and cuttlefish, and more distantly to the nautiloids.

References
 The Paleobiology Database accessed on 10/01/07

Paragastrioceratidae
Prehistoric animal subfamilies